Greater Birmingham can refer to:

Birmingham, United Kingdom, and the area surrounding it, the West Midlands conurbation.
 Birmingham metropolitan area, Alabama, U.S.

See also
Greater Birmingham Act 1911
 Greater Birmingham and Solihull Local Enterprise Partnership
West Midlands Combined Authority, which was referred to commonly as the Greater Birmingham Combined Authority during its formation.